Conrad Eugen Skjønberg (March 27, 1889 – July 25, 1971) was a Norwegian actor.

Eugen Skjønberg was married to the actress Henny Skjønberg. They resided at Ramstad. He was the father of Per Skjønberg, Pål Skjønberg, and Espen Skjønberg, and the grandfather of Hennika Skjønberg, Siv Skjønberg, and Jo Skjønberg, all of whom were actors and actresses.

Skjønberg started his career in the banking industry in Kragerø and Skien, but in his twenties he was discovered in the amateur theater by a dance teacher, who recommended him to Alma Fahlstrøm in 1913. Fahlstrøm referred him to Sophie Reimers for training, as well as for singing lessons with Maja Flagstad. Then he received a job at the Stavanger Permanent Theater (Stavanger faste scene) with Thora Hansson, and he made his debut as Johan Tønnessen in Henrik Ibsen's The Pillars of Society. He remained there until 1920.

He was then engaged with the National Theater from 1920 to 1924 before he went to Chat Noir to work under Victor Bernau, where he remained until 1929. After this he joined the newly opened Oslo New Theater, where he worked from 1929 to 1962, except for his years at the Trøndelag Theater, from 1937 to 1946.

Skjønberg participated in a number of recordings for NRK's Radio Theater, and among other things can be heard in the series about Dickie Dick Dickens and Ibsen pieces such as The League of Youth.

He was also a sought-after film actor and appeared in nearly 30 films in Norway and Sweden. Among the best known are Fant (1937), the banned film To mistenkelige personer (1950), and Vi gifter oss (1951).

Skjønberg received the King's Medal of Merit in gold in 1959.

Filmography
1921: Felix as the doctor
1921: Jomfru Trofast as Peder Flotten
1923: Iron Will as Ove Rolandsen
1925: Himmeluret as Andresen, a general store operator
1927: Den glade enke i Trangvik as Sivert, a sailor
1927: Madame besøker Oslo as Albert 
1932: En glad gutt as Øyvind's father 
1932: Fantegutten as Christian
1932: Prinsessen som ingen kunne målbinde as Per
1936: Morderen uten ansikt as Andresen, a manager
1936: Vi vil oss et land... as Kåre Fjell, a bookkeeper
1937: Fant as a bailiff
1940: Tørres Snørtevold as Koren
1948: Trollfossen as the foreign company representative
1949: Døden er et kjærtegn as a city court official
1949: Svendsen går videre
1949: Vi flyger på Rio 
1950: To mistenkelige personer
1951: Vi gifter oss as Mr. Gran
1952: Det kunne vært deg as Westberg
1953: Selkvinnen as Trondur Våg 
1953: Skøytekongen as Hellemo, a truck driver
1954: Portrettet as a watchman 
1955: Arthurs forbrytelse as a constable
1955: Hjem går vi ikke
1955: Savnet siden mandag
1955: The Summer Wind Blows as Tönne, the chairman
1956: Ektemann alene as Stenersen 
1956: Kvinnens plass

References

External links
 
 Eugen Skjønberg at the Swedish Film Database

1889 births
1971 deaths
Norwegian male stage actors
Norwegian male film actors
Norwegian male silent film actors
20th-century Norwegian male actors
People from Kragerø